The Chronicon Compostellanum is a narrative Latin chronicle of the history of Spain from the arrival of the Visigoths (which it dates to 362) until the death of Queen Urraca of León on 8 March 1126. It was probably written shortly after this date, and probably in Galicia. It covers the history of the Visigothic kingdom and their successors, the Kingdom of Asturias, rapidly, incorporating the Laterculum regum ovetensium ("List of the kings of Oviedo"), a regnal list of the Asturian monarchy from Pelagius to Alfonso II written sometime after 791 and also incorporated in the Chronicon Iriense and the Annales Portugalenses veteres. For the eleventh-century Kingdom of León it is the earliest surviving source after the Historia silense (1109–18). The cause of Urraca's death—in labour with the child of her lover, Pedro González de Lara—is recorded in the Chronicon. Its first editor and publisher, Enrique Flórez, in his twenty-eighth preliminary note to the appendix of Latin documents in the twenty-third volume of his España Sagrada, described the text thus:

Notes

Editions
Enrique Flórez, ed. "Chronicon ex Historiæ Compostellanæ Codice. Nunc primum editum." España Sagrada, XX (1765), 608–13, and XXIII (1767), 325–28. Madrid. 
Emma Falque Rey, ed. "Chronicon Compostellanum," Habis, 14(1983):73–83.

References
Therese Martin. "Hacia una clarificación del infantazgo en tiempos de la reina Urraca y su hija la infanta Sancha (ca. 1107–1159)." e-Spania, 5 June 2008 (online 1 July 2008). Accessed 23 May 2009. 
Gonzalo Martínez Díez. 2005. El condado de Castilla, 711–1038: La historia frente a la leyenda. Marcial Pons Historia, p. 756.
Bernard F. Reilly. 1988. The Kingdom of León-Castilla under King Alfonso VI, 1065–1109. Princeton: Princeton University Press.

Iberian chronicles
12th-century Latin books